Esther Lord Batchelder (19 May 1897 – 13 June 1987) was an American chemist, educator, and expert in the field of nutrition.

Biography
After graduating from Connecticut College in 1919, with a double major in chemistry and home economics, Batchelder went on to complete a Ph.D. in chemistry at Columbia University, in 1929, writing on a topic in food chemistry, under the direction of Henry C. Sherman.

From 1929 to 1932 she was a nutrition specialist for the women's magazine Delineator. She then held posts as assistant professor of nutrition at State College of Washington (1932–1934) and the University of Arizona (1934–1936). In 1936 she became the chairperson of the department of home economics at Rhode Island State College.

Over the course of more than two decades, beginning in 1942, she worked for the United States Department of Agriculture, initially in the human nutrition branch (as of 1943, the Bureau of Human Nutrition and Home Economics), where she rose to become head of the Food and Nutrition division; from 1956 until her retirement in 1965 she served as director of the division of Clothing and Housing Research.

In 1947 Batchelder served as a member of the War Department's food mission to Germany. In the face of the postwar food shortages in Germany that winter season, she helped to accomplish the dehydration of 120,000 tons of vegetables.

Batchelder was a longtime member of the Board of Trustees at her alma mater, Connecticut College; first elected to a three-year term in 1929, she served on the board continuously from 1937 to 1973.

Selected publications

Honors and awards
 1954: Distinguished Service Award, U.S. Department of Agriculture
 1969: Connecticut College Medal

References 

Washington State University faculty
20th-century American chemists
American women chemists
1897 births
1987 deaths
Connecticut College alumni
20th-century American women scientists
University of Rhode Island faculty
University of Arizona faculty
Columbia Graduate School of Arts and Sciences alumni
United States Department of Agriculture officials